The Ash Lad: In the Hall of the Mountain King is a 2017 Norwegian fantasy adventure film directed by Mikkel Brænne Sandemose and starring Vebjørn Enger. It was released on 29 September 2017. It was co-produced by Czech Republic's Sirene Film and Irish Subotica Entertainment.

Plot
Princess Kristin turns 18 and is obliged to be married. According to the legend, the wedding must happen at once, otherwise a gruesome troll will take her away to the mountain. Prince Fredrik arrives to wed Kristin, but she refuses him and runs away. The king promises his daughter's hand and half the kingdom to whoever can save her. Three poor farm boys, Per, Pål, and Espen, head out to find her and slay the Mountain King, in order to claim the reward and save their farm from ruin.

The film is based on an eighteenth-century Norwegian fairy tale.

Sequel
The plot is continued in Ash Lad 2: In Search of the Golden Castle (also directed by Mikkel Brænne Sandemose in 2019), in which Espen Askeladd (Vebjørn Enger) and Princess Kristin (Eili Harboe) star. Per and Pål are imprisoned in a dungeon and sentenced to death, falsely accused of poisoning the King and Queen, by Svein, who aspires to the throne. Espen and Kristin set out to find the water of life (and thus save her parents), in the mythical palace of Soria Moria, under an enchanted Norwegian lake. On the road they encounter robbers and fortune hunters, including a Danish warrioress Ohlmann, who has a sense of humour, but who is also chasing the same prize. Clues lead them to the lake, guarded by monsters. They succeed in their quest, barely avoiding the execution of their friends and the enthronement of the evil Svein. A third film is planned.

Cast
Vebjørn Enger as Espen Askeladd
Eili Harboe as Princess Kristin
Allan Hyde as Prince Frederick
Mads Sjøgård Pettersen as Per
Elias Holmen Sørensen as Pål
Gisken Armand as Stubbekjerringa
Gard B. Eidsvold as King Erik
Synnøve Macody Lund as Queen Viktoria
Thorbjørn Harr as Askeladden's father
Ida Ursin-Holm as Hulder
Rune Hagerup as The Messenger
Arthur Berning as Gunnar
Nasrin Khusrawi as Waitress
Antonio de la Cruz as Vesle-Jan

Release
The film was the second highest-grossing film in Norway in 2017, earning $4.23 million.

Critical reception
The CGI features of the film were criticized for being "more or less" by Morten Ståle Nilsen of Verdens Gang.

References

External links

2017 fantasy films
2017 films
Norwegian fantasy films
Films about trolls
Films based on fairy tales
2010s Norwegian-language films